The North Carolina Watermelon Festival is an annual celebration of the watermelon started in 1957 in Raleigh, North Carolina.  In 1985 it was relocated to  Murfreesboro, North Carolina. The festival features a seed-spitting contest, the crowning of a "Miss Watermelon" and an award for the best/biggest melons.

There'll be no celebration planned in 2020.

Winners

Watermelon grower
 1970 - Ed Weeks, 
 2004 - Adam Worley,

Miss Watermelon / Watermelon Queen
1966 Eleanor Brantley
1986 Whitney Cuthbertson
 2003  Tracy Lynn Register
 2009 Kensley Leonard
 2014 Breanna Williams

Seed spitting
 1963 - Wally Ausley - *
 1970 - John "Speedy" Adams - 
2004 - Kristin Cucci

* World Record

Activities
The four-day event now includes:
 a parade
 musical performances
 food festival
 carnival rides
 craft sales
 5 km run
 watermelon-seed spitting contest
 crowning of the Watermelon Princesses
 a visit from the North Carolina Watermelon Queen

References

External links

Festivals in North Carolina
Tourist attractions in Hertford County, North Carolina
Watermelons
Murfreesboro, North Carolina
Food and drink festivals in the United States
1957 establishments in North Carolina
Festivals established in 1957